Phragmacossia libani is a species of moth of the family Cossidae. It is found in Lebanon and Iraq.

References

Moths described in 1933
Zeuzerinae